2 Hours Love is a 2019 Indian romance film.

Plot
A love story with a tinge of suspense underlying. Hero and heroine love only for 2 hours a day. Irrespective of situations, they only love from 4 pm to 6 pm a day. Before 4 pm and after 6 pm, they behave as strangers. Even if they accidentally spot each other, they don't even wish/talk. Though the boy is reluctant in following it, he does it as the girl approves his love only on this condition. When Hero proposes Heroine, she will inform that she is busy and is free only for 2 hours a day and will love only from 4 pm to 6 pm of a day. She also mentions various conditions that they will not be lovers after 6 pm, they will not be involving friends and family during their time etc..Only if he agrees to all the conditions, she will agree to love him. She will also make an agreement with all the conditions and get it signed by the Hero. If he breaks any of the rules, she will break the relationship.

Cast 
 Sri Pawar as Adit
 Kriti Garg as Avika
 Tanikella Bharani as Bharani
 Narsing Yadav as Narsing
 Ashok vardan as Vasu

References

External links
 
 Reviews
 2 Hours Love Movie Review | 2 Hours Love Rating
 ‘2 అవర్స్ లవ్’ మూవీ రివ్యూ
 http://www.10tv.in/2hours-love-movie-review-13481
 2Hours Love Movie Review

2019 films
Indian romantic drama films
2019 romantic drama films
2010s Telugu-language films